The Battle of Menorca took place in the island Menorca between 7 and 9 February 1939 during the Spanish Civil War.

Background
After the fall of Catalonia, the island of Menorca, the only Balearic island held by the Republic, was isolated from other Republican-held territory by the Nationalist naval blockade. Francisco Franco informed the British government that Mussolini's Italian troops would abandon the Balearic Islands after the war and the British government agreed to arrange the surrender of the Republican garrison.

The uprising
On 8 January 1939 Admiral Luis González de Ubieta was transferred to Menorca to take the command of the Spanish Republican naval base at Puerto Mahon. He also was given the authority to command all the Republican military forces on the island.

On 7 February, the Royal Navy cruiser  arrived in Mahón harbour with a Nationalist emissary, Fernando Sartorius, on board. Sartorius said to the Republican commander, Luis González Ubieta, that the Nationalist forces would occupy the island on 8 February, but the Republican officers and supporters could abandon the island. The same day, three battalions of the Republican garrison, led by a member of the Fifth column, the officer Juan Thomas, occupied Ciutadella, after killing the Republican commander Marcelino Rodríguez. One brigade of Republican troops arrived from Mahon, and defeated the rebel troops after a brief engagement and surrounded Ciutadella. Nevertheless, the Republican officers, convinced that any resistance under those circumstances was pointless, asked for safe passage to the mainland. The British eventually arranged the surrender of Minorca to the Nationalists on board of Devonshire. On 8 February, Italian and Spanish Nationalist bombers attacked Mahón. The same day the Devonshire sailed to Marseille with 452 Republican refugees on board. On 9 February, the 105th division of the Nationalist Army disembarked at Ciutadella and the remaining Republican troops surrendered.

Aftermath
After the surrender of Menorca, many Republican officers in the central zone believed that they would negotiate a deal with the Nationalists, and then started to plan a coup against the Negrín government.

See also 

 List of Spanish Republican military equipment of the Spanish Civil War
 List of Spanish Nationalist military equipment of the Spanish Civil War
 Aviazione Legionaria

References

Menorca 1939
Menorca 1939
1939 in Spain
Menorca 1939
History of Menorca
Spain–United Kingdom military relations
Menorca 1939
February 1939 events